Stary Olsztyn  is a village in the administrative district of Gmina Purda, within Olsztyn County, Warmian-Masurian Voivodeship, in northern Poland. It is located within the historic region of Warmia.

A historic park is located in the village.

 rock guitarist Marek Jackowski was born in Stary Olsztyn.

References

Stary Olsztyn